Oberwinterthur is a district in the Swiss city of Winterthur. It is district number 2.

The district comprises the quarters Talacker, Guggenbühl, Zinzikon, Reutlingen, Stadel, Grüze, Hegmatten and Hegi.

Oberwinterthur was formerly a municipality of its own, but was incorporated into Winterthur in 1922, and the location of the Roman Vicus Vitudurum.

Transport 
Oberwinterthur railway station is a stop of the Zürich S-Bahn on the lines S8,  S29 and S30.

References

Winterthur
Former municipalities of the canton of Zürich